The men's 5000 metres event at the 2000 Asian Athletics Championships was held in Jakarta, Indonesia on 31 August.

Results

References

2000 Asian Athletics Championships
5000 metres at the Asian Athletics Championships